Britain, Australia and the Bomb: the Nuclear Tests and Their Aftermath is a 2006 book by Lorna Arnold and Mark Smith. It is the second edition of an official history first published in 1987 by HMSO under another title: A Very Special Relationship: British Atomic Weapons Trials in Australia. The book uses declassified material that has become available in the two decades prior to the book's publication. It covers the clean-up operations in the Maralinga Range and epidemiological studies on the health of the atomic test participants.

Lorna Arnold was a Fellow of both the Institute of Physics and Institute of Contemporary British History. Mark Smith is a Research Fellow at the Mountbatten Centre for International Studies, University of Southampton.

See also
 Nuclear tests in Australia
 Maralinga: Australia's Nuclear Waste Cover-up
 McClelland Royal Commission

References

2006 non-fiction books
Australian non-fiction books
Books about nuclear issues
Nuclear weapons policy
Palgrave Macmillan books